Asperula gunnii, the mountain woodruff, is a species of flowering plant in the family Rubiaceae. It is a perennial herb that is endemic to Australia.

Description
Leaves are usually arranged in whorls of 4 to 6 and are 4 to 8 mm long and 2.5 mm wide with pointed ends. White flowers are produced in summer in terminal or axillary cymes. Male flowers are around 2 mm long and female flowers are 3 mm long. These are followed by 1 to 2 mm long black fruits.

Distribution and habitat
Asperula gunnii occurs in damp or swampy conditions in grasslands or wooded areas at high altitudes in South Australia, Victoria, Tasmania and New South Wales.

Taxonomy
Asperula gunnii was first formally described by the English botanist Joseph Dalton Hooker in 1847 based on plant material collected by Ronald Gunn near the Nive River in Tasmania in 1840.

References

External links
World Checklist of Rubiaceae
Asperula gunnii (Grimwade Plant Collection)
Asperula gunnii (Yarra Ranges Local Plant Directory)

gunnii
Flora of New South Wales
Flora of South Australia
Flora of Tasmania
Flora of Victoria (Australia)
Taxa named by Joseph Dalton Hooker
Plants described in 1847